Paul Cairn Vellacott  (24 May 1891 – 15 November 1954) served as Headmaster of Harrow School and Master of Peterhouse, Cambridge.

The son of William Edward Vellacott (a Fellow of the Institute of Chartered Accountants who lived at Budleigh Salterton, Devon), he was educated at Marlborough College and Peterhouse, Cambridge, where he studied the Historical Tripos. He served as Headmaster of Harrow School from 1934 to 1939 and Master of Peterhouse from 1939 to 1954.

Vellacott was awarded the Distinguished Service Order and made a Commander of the Order of the British Empire.

On 20 June 1929 he married Hilda Francesca Lubbock, daughter of Sir Nevile Lubbock (1839–1914) and Constance Ann Herschel (daughter of astronomer John Herschel and granddaughter of astronomer William Herschel).

References 

1891 births
1954 deaths
Schoolteachers from Devon
Alumni of Peterhouse, Cambridge
Fellows of Peterhouse, Cambridge
Head Masters of Harrow School
Commanders of the Order of the British Empire
Companions of the Distinguished Service Order
Masters of Peterhouse, Cambridge